Louis César Constantin de Rohan (24 March 1697, Paris – 11 March 1779, Paris) was a French prelate of the House of Rohan.

Biography

Origin and youth 

Louis Caesar Constantine de Rohan-Guemène belonged to the House of Rohan, an ancient and powerful family of the nobility of Brittany which dates back to the xi th  century. Son of Charles III de Rohan, cousin of Armand-Gaston-Maximilien de Rohan and his second wife, Charlotte-Elisabeth de Cochefilet (1657-1719), he is the fourteenth and last child of the couple.
His brother Armand-Jules de Rohan-Guémené, future archbishop of Reims, had chosen the ecclesiastical state. Louis-César-Constantin de Rohan embraced at first the career of arms. He was first a Knight of Malta before entering the navy as a naval officer. He was promoted to capitaine de vaisseau in 1720.

Career in the Church 
In 1732, at the age of 35, he and entered upon an ecclesiastical career, being named canon and grand provost of Strasbourg. In 1734 he was appointed commendatory Abbot of Lyre Abbey, near Evreux, then first chaplain to the King in 1748, commendatory Abbot of Saint-Epvre the following year, and prelate-commander of the Order of the Holy Spirit in 1753.
On the death   in 1756 of his uncle, Armand de Rohan-Soubise, he was appointed to succeed him as Bishop of Strasbourg, a post which carried with it the title of  Prince of the Holy Roman Empire  (though  most of  the principality's territory  situated on the left bank of the Rhine had been annexed by France in the late 17th century) and likewise the title of Count of Alsace. However, he was not made Grand Almoner of France, unlike other members of the   Rohan family who became bishops of Strasbourg. 

He was created cardinal by Pope Clement XIII at the Consistory of 23 November 1761. However, he did not take part in the conclave of 1769, summoned upon the death of Pope Clement XIII, nor in the conclave of 1774-1775, summoned upon the death of Pope Clement XIV.

His cousin and successor as Cardinal Prince-Bishop of Strasbourg,  Louis-René-Édouard de Rohan-Guémené, would be compromised in the Affair of the Diamond Necklace.

Coat of arms 

Blazon :

Quarterly: in 1 and 4: from gules to a strip of silver loaded with a cotice of Vert; In 2 and 3: Gules to the silver band rubbed with two blossoms of the same (which is Basse-Alsace); On the whole, quartered: in 1 and 4: Gules with golden chains placed in orle, cross and saltire, loaded in the heart of an emerald in the natural (which is Navarre ); In 2 and 3: Azure with fleur-de-lys of gold; On the whole: part: in 1: Gules with nine twins , laid 3, 3, 3 (which is Rohan ); And in 2 of ermine (which is from Brittany ).

Comments:

Bibliography 
 Louis Châtellier, "Louis-César-Constantin de Rohan", New dictionary of Alsatian biography , vol. 32, p. 3268
 Jean-Claude Fauveau, Prince Louis, Cardinal de Rohan-Guéméné, or the Diamonds of the King on Google Books , Éditions L'Harmattan, 2007, p.  31
 Michel Popoff and preface by Hervé Pinoteau, Paris, Leopard d'or,1996, 204  p. ;

Related articles 
 House of Rohan
 Palais Rohan, Strasbourg
 Cardinals created by Clement XIII
 List of bishops, prince-bishops and archbishops of Strasbourg

External links 
On other Wikimedia projects:
 Louis-Constantin de Rohan, on Wikimedia Commons
 Authority Records  :Virtual International Authority File  • University Documentation System  •Gemeinsame Normdatei
 Card of Rohan-Guéméné on the site fiu.edu  [ archive ]

1697 births
1779 deaths
Bishops of Strasbourg
18th-century French cardinals
Louis Constantin de Rohan
Clergy from Paris